Megan Jane Crowhurst is an Australian- and Canadian-raised linguist and Professor of Linguistics at the University of Texas at Austin in the United States.

Career 
Crowhurst earned her BA in Linguistics at the University of British Columbia (1985) and the MA and PhD at the University of Arizona (1989 and 1991). She has held academic positions at Yale University, the University of North Carolina at Chapel Hill, and, since 1999, in the Department of Linguistics at the University of Texas at Austin. 

She works in the area of phonology, researching aspects of prosody, especially prosodic morphology, phonological stress, and the perception of rhythm. Often focusing on documenting these aspects within endangered languages, she has conducted fieldwork with speakers of Tupi-Guarani languages in Bolivia and speakers of Zapotec in Oaxaca, Mexico.

Honors and distinctions 
Crowhurst was a member of the Linguistic Society of America (LSA) task force that created the Women In Linguistics Mentoring Alliance (WILMA) to provide a system to offer mentoring opportunities for female linguists. She also served on the LSA committee, Endangered Languages and Their Preservation, chairing the committee in 2001. Crowhurst has served as the Senior Associate Editor (2016-2017) and Co-editor (2017-2020) of the journal Language. She is a co-founder of the LSA journal Phonological Data and Analysis. Crowhurst was inducted as a Fellow of the Linguistic Society of America in January 2021.

Selected publications 
Megan J. Crowhurst. 2019. The Iambic/Trochaic Law: Nature or Nurture? Language and Linguistic Compass, 2019;e12360. DOI: 10.1111/lnc3.12360
Megan J. Crowhurst. 2018. The influence of varying vowel phonation and duration on rhythmic grouping preferences among Spanish and English speakers. J. Phonetics, 66 (Jan.), 82-99. DOI: 10.1016/j.wocn.2017.09.001
Megan J. Crowhurst. 2018. The joint influence of vowel duration and creak on the perception of internal phrase boundaries.  J. Acoustical Society of America, 143(3), EL147-153. DOI: 10.1121/1.5025325
Megan Crowhurst. 2016. Iambic-Trochaic law effects among native speakers of Spanish and English. Laboratory Phonology: Journal of the Association for Laboratory Phonology, 7(1), 12.
Megan Crowhurst and Sara Trechter. 2014. Vowel-rhotic metathesis in Guarayu. International Journal of American Linguistics.
Megan Jane Crowhurst and Lev D. Michael. 2005. Iterative footing and prominence-driven stress in Nanti (Kampa). Language.

References

External links

LSA Member Spotlight: http://www.linguisticsociety.org/content/january-2016-member-spotlight-megan-crowhurst

Video, “Beyond the Iambic-Trochaic Law”: https://www.youtube.com/watch?v=X0wiCzy4YBA

Faculty page at UT Austin: https://liberalarts.utexas.edu/linguistics/faculty/crowhurs

The Archive of the Indigenous Languages of Latin America—South American Languages Collection of Megan Crowhurst:
https://www.ailla.utexas.org/islandora/object/ailla%3A124383

Women linguists
University of Arizona alumni
University of Texas at Austin faculty
Living people
Linguists of Uto-Aztecan languages
Year of birth missing (living people)
Fellows of the Linguistic Society of America